This is a list of the 13 members of the European Parliament for Lithuania in the 2004 to 2009 session.

List

Notes

Lithuania
List
2004